Dongnae District is a gu in central Busan, South Korea.

Administrative divisions

It has a population of about 300,000, and an area of 16.7 square kilometers.  It was once a separate city, the principal port of southeastern Korea.  Numerous historical relics are preserved in the area. 

This district is well known for Pajeon, which is 'Green Onion Pancake'.

DongRaeGu is also the ID for the Korean StarCraft II pro gamer, Park Soo-ho. Due to his success in events such as the Global StarCraft II League and Major League Gaming, he was recognized by the town and was allowed to officially represent the town by being able to place a badge on his uniform.

Dongnae-gu is divided into seven legal dong, which altogether comprise 14 administrative dong, as follows:

Allak-dong (2 administrative dong)
Boksan-dong
Myeongjang-dong (2 administrative dong)
Myeongnyun-dong (2 administrative dong)
Oncheon-dong (3 administrative dong)
Sajik-dong (3 administrative dong)
Sumin-dong

Places of interest
Sajik-dong is home to two major sports venues: Sajik Baseball Stadium (home of KBO team Lotte Giants) and Sajik Arena (home to various basketball teams). Both venues, alongside the nearby Sajik Swimming Pool, hosted the baseball, basketball, gymnastics, swimming and diving events of the 2002 Asian Games held in Busan.

Heosimcheong Spa, Asia's largest spa, is in Oncheon-dong.

The Bokcheon-dong Ancient Tombs Park is a tourist attraction and archeological site located in Bokcheon-dong.

Sister cities
 Hongkou, China

Education
 Daesung Academy

See also  
Geography of South Korea

Festivals
Dongnae District Castle Festival opens every October since 1996.

References

External links
English-language homepage of Dongnae-gu

 
Districts of Busan